Study South Africa is an annual publication of the International Education Association of South Africa (IEASA) in association with Universities South Africa (USAf), and serves as a guide to higher education in South Africa. Study South Africa is also known as Study South Africa: the guide to South African Higher Education.

Scope 
The monograph series includes articles pertaining to internationalization within the Higher Education environment of South Africa. Each monograph in the series is themed e.g. the 2018 issue was themed Advancing internationalisation in an era of transformation

Editors 
2001–2003: Andy Mason
2004-2004: Alexandra van Essche
2005–2008: Roshen Kishun
2009–2016: Nico Jooste
2017-current: Orla Quinlan

References

External links 
 Study South Africa archives 

Annual magazines
Education magazines
Education in South Africa
English-language magazines
Magazines established in 2001
Magazines published in South Africa